Urut (also romanized as Urrut) is a town in the Lori Province of Armenia.

Prominent people born in Urut 
Norik Khalatyan, nuclear physicist, PhD
Vachagan Khalatyan, Deaf educator, PhD, originator of Armenian manual alphabet

References 
 
 World Gazeteer: Armenia – World-Gazetteer.com

Populated places in Lori Province